Pancreatic Stone Protein (PSP), also known as Lithostathine-1-alpha islet cells regeneration factor (ICRF) or islet of Langerhans regenerating protein (REG) is a protein that in humans is encoded by the REG1A gene as a single polypeptide of 144 amino acids further cleaved by trypsin to produce a 133 amino acid protein that is O-linked glycosylated on threonine 27. This protein is a type I subclass member of the Regenerating protein family. The Reg protein family is a multi protein family grouped into four subclasses, types I, II, III and IV based on the primary structures of the proteins.
Reg family members REG1B, REGL, PAP and this gene are tandemly clustered on chromosome 2p12 and may have arisen from the same ancestral gene by gene duplication.
The PSP is mostly produced in Human by the acinar cells of the pancreas and is secreted in the duodenum by the same pathway that pancreatic exocrine enzymes. It has C-terminal C-type lectin domain whose binding partner is currently unknown.

Function

Pancreas development and regeneration 
The PSP has been shown to be associated with islet cell regeneration and diabetogenesis and may be involved in pancreatic lithogenesis.

Sepsis 
The blood PSP concentration has been shown to increase substantially in response to a sepsis event. Consequently, the use of the PSP as a biomarker of sepsis has been investigated thoroughly and the result of these researches confirmed the high diagnostic accuracy of the PSP for sepsis. Of particular interest, PSP concentration has been shown to increase early in the development of a septic event, as illustrated in a cohort of severely burnt patients

References

Further reading